The Honorary Title "Honoured Military Pilot of the USSR" was a state military award of the Soviet Union established on January 26, 1965, by Decree of the Presidium of the Supreme Soviet No. 3230-VI to recognise and reward excellence in military aviation.  It was abolished on August 22, 1988, by decree of the Presidium of the Supreme Soviet No. 9441-XI.

Award statute 
The honorary title "Honoured Military Pilot of the USSR" was awarded to members of military flying units, military agencies, military schools, military organizations and other military or federal authorities, having qualified military pilots 1st class or military pilot-instructors 1st class, for outstanding achievements in the development of aviation technology, high performance in education and training of flight personnel and long-term trouble-free flight operations in military aviation.

The Presidium of the Supreme Soviet of the USSR was the main conferring authority of the award based on recommendations from the Ministry of Defence of the USSR.

The chest badge "Honoured Military Pilot of the USSR" was worn on the right side of the chest and in the presence of other orders, placed over them.  If worn with honorary titles of the Russian Federation, the latter have precedence.

Award description 
The "Honoured Military Pilot of the USSR" chest badge was a 27-millimetre-wide by 23-millimetre-high silver-and-nickel polygon with raised edges. At the top of the obverse, the relief inscription in three lines covered to the left "Honoured MILITARY PILOT", in the center, the gilt tombac image of a jet plane climbing diagonally towards the right its nose and tail slightly protruding over the edges, at the bottom, the relief inscription "USSR" superimposed over a laurel branch.

The badge was secured to a standard Soviet square mount by a silver-plated ring through the suspension loop. The mount was covered by a silk moiré red ribbon.

Notable Recipients (partial list)
Georgy Baevsky
 Leonid Beda
 Andrey Borovykh
 Alexander Yefimov
 Pavel Kutakhov
 Vladimir Mikhaylov
 Mikhail Odintsov
 Pavel Plotnikov
 Vitaly Popkov
 Vasily Reshetnikov
 Yevgeny Savitsky
 Sultan Sosnaliyev
Nikolai Sutyagin
 Anatoly Tchernov
 Ivan Zhukov

See also 

Orders, decorations, and medals of the Soviet Union
Honoured Military Pilot of the Russian Federation
Badges and Decorations of the Soviet Union
Soviet Air Force

References

External links 
Legal Library of the USSR

Military awards and decorations of the Soviet Union
Honorary titles of the Soviet Union
Awards established in 1965
Awards disestablished in 1988